Ödön Holits (7 December 1886 – 2 April 1970) was a Hungarian athlete. He competed in the men's long jump at the 1908 Summer Olympics. He also played football, and appeared for the Hungary national team.

References

1886 births
1970 deaths
Athletes (track and field) at the 1908 Summer Olympics
Hungarian male long jumpers
Olympic athletes of Hungary
Place of birth missing
Hungarian footballers
Hungary international footballers
Association footballers not categorized by position